Khelu (c. 794–846) was the 32nd king of Pagan Dynasty of Burma and the last king of Tampavati period of Bagan. He was the eldest son of Saw Khin Hnit and older brother of Pyinbya. He reigned over Bagan for 17 years. After his death, he was succeeded by his brother, Pyinbya.

Pagan dynasty
790s births
846 deaths
Year of birth uncertain
9th-century Burmese monarchs